Edward Parry  (8 or 9 December 1892 – year of death unknown) was a Welsh international footballer. He was part of the Wales national football team between 1922 and 1926, playing 5 matches. He played his first match on 4 February 1922 against Scotland and his last match on 13 February 1926 against Northern Ireland. At club level he played for Liverpool. He later became trainer of home town club Colwyn Bay.

See also
 List of Wales international footballers (alphabetical)

References

1892 births
People from Colwyn Bay
Sportspeople from Conwy County Borough
Welsh footballers
Wales international footballers
Place of birth missing
Year of death missing
Liverpool F.C. players
Association footballers not categorized by position